Enrico Barberi (Bologna, 22 July 1850 – Bologna, 1941) was an Italian sculptor.

Biography 
Enrico Barberi attended the Academy of Fine Arts in Bologna and was a student of Salvino Salvini. Between 1871 and 1873 he did an apprenticeship in Florence with the sculptor Giovanni Dupré. In 1876 he distinguished himself among the promises of the Academy of Fine Arts exhibiting the great plaster Otriade. He taught at the Institute of Fine Arts and then, between 1895 and 1921, at the Academy of Fine Arts in Bologna, holding the chair of sculpture. Under his direction were formed generations of sculptors, some of whom will be figures of national and international importance. Among the many: Silverio Montaguti, Giuseppe Romagnoli, Farpi Vignoli, Antonio Alberghini, Cleto Tomba and Giuseppe Virgili.

He was among the participants of the artistic guild of the Aemilia Ars, collaborating and making friends with Achille Casanova, Alfonso Rubbiani, Luigi Serra, Alfredo Tartarini. The poet and art critic Alfonso Panzacchi was a sincere admirer of his and Barberi made at least two portraits of him. He was for a long time professor of sculpture at the Collegio Artistico Venturoli in Bologna, where he left many works and models of his sculptures. It is possible to admire an ample catalog of his marbles - covering all his long activity - in the Certosa of Bologna. Inside the Galleria degli Angeli there are two masterpieces, the Monument of Raffaele Bisteghi (1891) and the one dedicated to the opera singers Adelaide and Erminia Borghi-Mamo (1894). In the Church of San Girolamo there is the refined monument to Cardinal Vincenzo Moretti (1882). Among the rare public works is the bronze Monument to Marcello Malpighi (1897), placed in the square of Crevalcore. In 1897 he was commissioned by the mayor to draw up a report on the "state of health" of the Neptune Fountain of Bologna in Piazza Maggiore. The sculptor advised to keep the statue in a museum and replace it with a copy. Until 1919 Barberi remained an official consultant for Neptune.

Main works at the Monumental Cemetery of Certosa di Bologna 

 Hall of the Pantheon of the illustrious men: statues of the friend-painter Luigi Serra, of Francesco Rocchi and Paolo Venturini
 Borghi Mamo Monument, Gallery of the Angels
 Monument of Raffaele Bisteghi
 Monument of Cardinal Vincenzo Moretti
 Monument of Rivani Family
 Monument of Camillo Zambeccari Zanchini
 Monument to Emilio Putti, Cloister V
 Rivani Monument, Cloister III
 Trombetti Monument, Galleria degli Angeli
 Cavazza Monument, Gallery of the Angels
 Garelli Monument, Gallery of Angels
 Vespignanni Cell, Gallery of Angels
 Cella Facchini, Gallery of the Angels
 Pezzoli Monument, Cloister VII
 Berlinzani Monument, Cloister VII
 Veratti Monument, Cloister VII
 Lorenzini Monument, Cloister VII
 Agostini Monument, Cloister VII
 Guidicini Monument, Cloister VII
 Pizzoli Monument, Cloister VII
 Pezzoli Monument, Cloister VII
 Faccioli Brugnoli Monument, Cloister IX
 Monument to Goffredo Franceschi, Corsia del Colombario

Other works 

 Promoteo, kept at the Academy of Fine Arts, Bologna
 San Francesco, Capuchin church, Imola
 Bust of Enrico Panzacchi, 1812, for the gardens in Bologna
 Several funerary monuments in the cemetery of Cesena.

Donations 
In 1987 his nephew Mario donated to the Galleria d'Arte Moderna of Bologna documents and drawings by Luigi Serra, probably received by Barberi directly from the painter.

Gallery

References

Bibliography 

 Coscienza urbana e urbanistica tra due millenni, vol. 1., Fatti bolognesi dal 1796 alla prima guerra mondiale, Bologna, San Giorgio in Poggiale, 11 dicembre 1993-13 febbraio 1994, a cura di Franca Varignana, Bologna, Grafis, 1993, p. 211.
 Stefano Tumidei, La scultura dell'Ottocento in Certosa, in La Certosa, immortalità della memoria, Bologna, Compositori, 1998.
 Roberto Martorelli, Cento anni di scultura bolognese. L'album fotografico Belluzzi e le sculture del Museo civico del Risorgimento, num. monografico del “Bollettino del Museo del Risorgimento”, LIII (2008).
 S. Pezzoli, O. Piraccini (a cura di), L'artista e l'amico: ritorno a Luigi Serra - opere e documenti dalla raccolta di Enrico Guizzardi, Bologna, Compositori, 2008.
 Roberto Martorelli (a cura di), La Certosa di Bologna - Un libro aperto sulla storia, catalogo della mostra, Tipografia Moderna, Bologna, 2009.
 Beatrice Buscaroli, Roberto Martorelli (a cura di), Luce sulle tenebre - Tesori preziosi e nascosti dalla Certosa di Bologna, catalogo della mostra, Bologna, Bononia University Press, 2010.
 
 Benedetta Basevi e Mirko Nottoli (a cura di), Enrico Barberi e la fontana del Nettuno: il fondo di disegni Barberi nelle collezioni d'arte e di storia della Fondazione Cassa di risparmio in Bologna, Fondazione Cassa di risparmio in Bologna, Bononia University Press, 2018 ISBN 9788869233241

Sister projects 
  Wikimedia Commons contiene immagini o altri file su Enrico Barberi

External links 

  
 
 
 

Burials at Certosa cemetery
1941 deaths
1850 births
20th-century Italian sculptors
19th-century Italian sculptors